Bavarian B IIs were steam locomotives with the Royal Bavarian State Railways (Königlich Bayerische Staatsbahn).

This class was delivered at the same time as the A III and had all the same construction features. 

They were equipped with 3 T 5 tenders.

See also
 List of Bavarian locomotives and railbuses

2-4-0 locomotives
B 02
Maffei locomotives
Standard gauge locomotives of Germany
Railway locomotives introduced in 1851
1B n2 locomotives
Passenger locomotives